Annamária Szalai (16 September 1961 – 12 April 2013) was a Hungarian journalist, politician, Member of Parliament (MP) for Zala County, Fidesz (1998–2004). She became a member of the National Radio and Television Commission (ORTT) in 2004, and as a result resigned from her parliamentary seat. Szalai served as President of the National Media and Infocommunications Authority (NMHH) from 2010 until her death.

References

External links
 Register parlament.hu 
  parlament.hu 

1961 births
2013 deaths
Hungarian journalists
Hungarian women journalists
Hungarian economists
Women members of the National Assembly of Hungary
Fidesz politicians
Members of the National Assembly of Hungary (1998–2002)
Members of the National Assembly of Hungary (2002–2006)
People from Zalaegerszeg
20th-century Hungarian women politicians
21st-century Hungarian women politicians